The 1960 Texas tropical storm brought severe but localized flooding to southeastern Texas in June 1960. The first tropical cyclone and first tropical storm of the 1960 Atlantic hurricane season, this system developed from an area of showers and thunderstorms in the Bay of Campeche on June 22. Initially a tropical depression, it strengthened and was estimated to have reached tropical storm status on June 23. Later that day, it made landfall near Corpus Christi, Texas, at the same intensity. The storm weakened slowly and moved across the Central United States, before dissipating over Illinois on June 28.

Thus considerable flooding occurred in some areas of south and eastern Texas. Throughout the state, more than 150 houses sustained flood damage in several counties. In addition, numerous major highways were closed, including portions of U.S. Routes 59, 87, 90, and then-185, and Texas State Highways 35 and 71. In Arkansas, a few buildings in Hot Springs were damaged from high winds. Flooding in that state resulted in three deaths from drowning. Light to moderate rainfall was recorded in at least 11 other states, though damage was minimal. The storm was the rainiest tropical cyclone on record in the state of Kentucky, dropping  in Dunmor. Overall, 18 fatalities were attributed to the storm and $3.6 million (1960 USD) in damage was reported.

Meteorological history

In late June 1960, a large mass of deep convection developed in the Gulf of Mexico. A reconnaissance flight into the system on June 22 did not indicate a closed circulation. However, weather stations in Mexico reported a circulation and thus, it is estimated that the first tropical depression of the season developed at 0600 UTC on June 22. Early on June 23, barometric pressures in from Tampico, Tamaulipas to Brownsville, Texas had significantly decreased, which indicated that the tropical cyclone was moving generally northward. However, the plane may not have flown under the most intense convection.

The depression gradually strengthened, and by 0600 UTC on June 23, it reached tropical storm status. Over Texas, airborne radars and the Dow Chemical Company radar in Freeport indicated curved convective banding associated with the storm. Though no wall cloud was reported, the Kelly Air Force Base reported a cloud center. At 0400 UTC that day, the tropical storm made landfall near Corpus Christi, Texas. After moving inland, the storm quickly weakened back to a tropical depression. Over the following 24 hours, the depression executed a small cyclonic loop over southern Texas. On June 26, the depression accelerated to the north-northeast, and eventually dissipated over northern Illinois on June 29 at 0000 UTC.

Impact

Texas

Some towns in Texas considered it the worst disaster since a hurricane in 1945. In Copano Bay, waves produced by the storm damaged three fishing piers; a shrimp boat also capsized, killing three people. In addition, another ship was beached.

As a result, water  was reported in several homes and businesses in Port Lavaca. Two boys drowned in Port Lavaca after being swept by flood waters into the city harbor. Over  fell in Bay City. It was reported by the Bay City Tribune that all of Matagorda County was "under water". Due to large amounts of precipitation, portions of U.S. Routes 59, 87, 90, and then-185, and Texas State Highways 35 and 71. At the height of the storm, about one-fourth of the streets in Houston were flooded. Three subdivisions of the city were significantly affected by flooding: Alameda Plaza, Pleasantville, and Sunnyside. Many shingles were blown off the roof of a house, and then water caused the roof to collapse into the dining room and living room. However, no one was injured or killed. Several hundred people were evacuated from places with poor drainage or low-lying areas. Between 150 and 200 houses were affected by flooding and damaged estimates reached $1.5 million in Harris County alone. In addition, three people drowned in the flood waters in Houston.

Following the storm, the town of Port Lavaca requested aid from the United States Navy and Fourth United States Army. Later, cots and blankets were sent by helicopters and trucks. Three schools were opened as shelters for flood refugees in Port Lavaca. The Texas Department of State Health Services sent water and sanitation teams to the areas affected by the storm, as well as 3,000 shots of typhoid vaccine. In addition, Calhoun County was declared a disaster area. Overall, the storm caused $3.6 million and 15 fatalities in the state of Texas.

Elsewhere
Elsewhere along the Gulf Coast of the United States, light to moderate rainfall was reported in the states of Mississippi and Louisiana. The storm brought moderate to heavy rainfall throughout Arkansas. The Ouachita River reached flood stage at Arkadelphia. Three children drowned near Redfield after the car they were occupying was swept off U.S. Route 65 and fell into a ditch. Near Hot Springs, high winds damaged a few buildings.

The storm dropped rainfall was far north as Michigan and Wisconsin. In those two states, precipitation was generally light, and did not exceed . Rainfall totals reached  in Wisconsin and Michigan, respectively.

See also

List of wettest tropical cyclones in the United States
Hurricane Carla (1961)
Tropical Storm Candy (1968)
Tropical Storm Grace (2003)

References

External links
Monthly Weather Review
Rainfall Map

Texas tropical_storm
Hurricanes in Oklahoma
Hurricanes in Mississippi
Hurricanes in Arkansas
Hurricanes in Tennessee
Hurricanes in Missouri
Hurricanes in Illinois
Hurricanes in Indiana
Hurricanes in Michigan
1960 natural disasters in the United States
Floods in Texas
Atlantic tropical storms